Sonan may refer to:

Jinhaku Sonan (楚南 仁博 1892–1984) a Japanese entomologist
Sonan's salamander, Hynobius sonani, a salamander in the family Hynobiidae, endemic to Taiwan, where it occurs in the Central Mountain Range
"Sōnan" (遭難 "Distress"), the second single by Japanese rock band Tokyo Jihen

See also
Sonans Utdanning, a private institution offering general subjects at upper secondary (akin to high school) level and vocational school in Norway
Sonans, Virginia, an unincorporated community in Pittsylvania County